Ordo Militia Templi is the first studio album by the Italian Black ambient/Gothic rock band Militia Christi.

Track listing
 Annus Domini - 5.16
 Agnus Dei - 6.13
 Processus criminalis pro destructione lamiarum - 4.29
 Eresia Christi - 4.26
 Osanna - 6.07
 Tempestatibus Diaboli - 5.18
 Nigra Virgo - 4.20
 Rei Unius - 4.02
 Alleluia - 3.01

2001 albums